Andrea Raimondi (born 26 June 1990) is an Italian footballer who plays for Italian club A.C. Delta Calcio Rovigo.

Biography
Born in Padua, Veneto, Raimondi started his career at Calcio Padova. In January 2009 he left for Sangiovannese. In July 2009 the temporary deal was renewed as Padova was promoted to 2009–10 Serie B. In August 2010 he was signed by Juve Stabia. Raimondi won promotion again as playoffs winner. In July 2011 Raimondi's temporary deal was renewed again.

International career
Raimondi played twice in 2007 UEFA European Under-17 Football Championship qualification. In 2011–12 season Raimondi capped twice for Italy under-21 Serie B representative team.

References

External links
 FIGC 
 Football.it Profile 
 

1990 births
Sportspeople from Padua
Living people
Italian footballers
Italy youth international footballers
Association football forwards
Calcio Padova players
A.S.D. Sangiovannese 1927 players
S.S. Juve Stabia players
Trapani Calcio players
Venezia F.C. players
Cosenza Calcio players
Benevento Calcio players
F.C. Arzignano Valchiampo players
Serie B players
Serie C players
Serie D players
Footballers from Veneto